Drew Karpyshyn (born July 28, 1971) is a Canadian video game scenario writer, scriptwriter and novelist. He served as a senior writer for BioWare's Star Wars: Knights of the Old Republic and lead writer for the first two Mass Effect video games. He left BioWare in 2012 to focus on his Chaos Born novels, and returned to it three years later in 2015. On March 9, 2018, he announced he was leaving BioWare once again to pursue his independent work.

Career
Karpyshyn was at one point employed as a loan officer. Following a car accident, he quit his job and returned to college, gaining a degree in English. He got his start as a game designer for Wizards of the Coast, and he also has written two novels for Wizards of the Coast, both published in 2001 and both set in the Forgotten Realms setting: Baldur's Gate II: Throne of Bhaal and Temple Hill.

Karpyshyn joined the video game company BioWare in 2000. He wrote the scenario and much of the dialogue for Star Wars: Knights of the Old Republic, for which he would share the award for "Excellence in Writing" at the 2003 Game Developers Choice Awards. He was later one of the lead writers and planners on Jade Empire, and worked on several games in the Baldur's Gate series. His next major project was the Mass Effect series of games. His third book, Darth Bane: Path of Destruction was published by Del Rey Ballantine Books in 2006.

Mass Effect was named Game of the Year, in addition to receiving four other awards at the 2008 Elan Awards.

Karpyshyn moved to Austin, Texas to help with Star Wars: The Old Republic. He left BioWare in February 2012 to focus more on his own projects. He returned to BioWare 3 years later in 2015 to focus on the post-release development of SWTOR. He later started working on Anthem in 2017. In March 2018, he announced that he would once again leave BioWare to work on other things, including more original novels, co-creating a sci-fi graphic novel, and freelance gaming work.

Karphyshyn announced in February 2020 that he had joined Archetype Entertainment, an internal studio of Wizards of the Coast with former BioWare staff James Ohlen and Chad Robertson as studio leads. Archetype had been revealed in January 2020 and that it was working on a new science fiction role-playing game. Karphyshyn said that while his interest in video game development waned as BioWare had changed over the years, "my passion has been rekindled. The feel in the studio reminds me of my early days at BioWare; I can feel the magic in the air."

Personal life
In March 2000, Karpyshyn appeared on an episode of Jeopardy!, finishing third. He is a fan of the NFL's San Diego Chargers. He believes that in the NFL, Bill Belichick is most likely to follow the ways of the Sith, and Peyton Manning is the most likely to be a Jedi. Though his musical tastes lean more to what he calls "mainstream alternative", such as the Foo Fighters and Green Day, he also enjoys Sage Francis' song "The Best of Times". He prefers to write at night without any music playing.

Karpyshyn was born on July 28, 1971 in Edmonton, Alberta, Canada. He previously lived in Sherwood Park, Alberta, Canada, with his wife Jennifer. In the spring of 2009, he moved with his family to Austin, Texas.

Works

Games
 Baldur's Gate II: Shadows of Amn (2000)
 Baldur's Gate II: Throne of Bhaal (2001)
 Neverwinter Nights (2002)
 Neverwinter Nights: Hordes of the Underdark (2003)
 Star Wars: Knights of the Old Republic (2003)
 Jade Empire (2005)
 Mass Effect (2007)
 Mass Effect 2 (2010)
 Star Wars: The Old Republic (2011)
 Anthem (2019)

Novels

Forgotten Realms
 Baldur's Gate II: Throne of Bhaal (novelization) (2001)
 Temple Hill (2001)

Star Wars
 Star Wars - Darth Bane: Path of Destruction (2006)
 Star Wars - Darth Bane: Rule of Two (2007)
 Star Wars - Darth Bane: Dynasty of Evil (2009)
 Star Wars: The Old Republic: Revan (2011)
 Star Wars: The Old Republic: Annihilation (2012)

Mass Effect
 Mass Effect: Revelation (2007) (Prequel to the video game series)
 Mass Effect: Ascension (2008)
 Mass Effect: Retribution (2010)

Chaos Born
 Children of Fire (2013)
 The Scorched Earth (2014)
 Chaos Unleashed (2015)

References

External links

 
 Drew Karpyshyn at Wizards of the Coast
 
 Interviews
 Drew Karpyshyn on Ten Minute Interviews (January 2015)
 Drew Karpyshyn Interview with RoqooDepot.com (September 2008)
 Drew Karpyshyn Star Wars Celebration VI Interview with RoqooDepot.com (August 2012)
 Drew Karpyshyn 'Annihilation' Interview with RoqooDepot.com (November 2012)
 Drew Karpyshyn Interview with Game-Spectrum at the Internet Archive (June 2007)
 

1971 births
21st-century Canadian novelists
BioWare people
Canadian fantasy writers
Canadian male novelists
Canadian science fiction writers
Dungeons & Dragons video game designers
Jeopardy! contestants
Living people
Star Wars: Knights of the Old Republic developers
Video game writers
Writers from Edmonton